Elymnias vasudeva, the Jezebel palmfly, is a butterfly in the family Nymphalidae. It was described by Frederic Moore in 1857. It is found in the Indomalayan realm.

Subspecies
E. v. vasudeva (Sikkim, Nepal)
E. v. thycana Wallace, 1869 (India)
E. v. deva (Moore, 1893) (Assam)
E. v. burmensis (Moore, 1893) (Yunnan, Burma)
E. v. oberthuri Fruhstorfer, 1902 (Thailand)
E. v. sinensis Chou, Zhang & Xie, 2000 (Yunnan)

References

External links
"Elymnias Hübner, 1818" at Markku Savela's Lepidoptera and Some Other Life Forms

Elymnias
Butterflies described in 1857